The First Baby is a 1936 American comedy film directed by Lewis Seiler and written by Lamar Trotti. The film stars Johnny Downs, Shirley Deane, Jane Darwell, Dixie Dunbar, Marjorie Gateson and Gene Lockhart. The film was released on April 2, 1936, by 20th Century Fox.

Plot

Cast 
Johnny Downs as Johnny Ellis
Shirley Deane as Trudy Wells
Jane Darwell as Mrs. Ellis
Dixie Dunbar as Maude Holbrook
Marjorie Gateson as Mrs. Wells
Gene Lockhart as Mr. Ellis
Taylor Holmes as Mr. Wells
Willard Robertson as Dr. Clarke
Hattie McDaniel as Dora

References

External links
 

1936 films
American comedy films
1936 comedy films
20th Century Fox films
Films directed by Lewis Seiler
American black-and-white films
Films with screenplays by Lamar Trotti
Films scored by Samuel Kaylin
1930s English-language films
1930s American films